{{Infobox university
 |name              = Mikhail Shchepkin Higher Theatre School
 |image_name        = Neglinnaya 6 - Shchepkin Theatre School.JPG
 |image_size        = 250px
 |image_alt         = M.S. Schepkin Higher Theatre School (Institute)
 |caption           = Under the State Academic Maly Theatre
 |city              = Moscow
 |state             = Russia
 |coor              = 
 |website           = chepkin.maly.ru schepkin.maly.ru/eng   
 |footnotes         = 
}}

The Mikhail Semyonovich Shchepkin  Higher Theatre School (Institute)''' is a drama school associated with the State Academic Maly Theatre in Moscow.  It was established in 1809 by decree of Alexander I of Russia.

History
Since 1938, the school has been named after Mikhail Shchepkin, a prominent Russian actor and college teacher in the period from 1830 until his death in 1863. With the direct assistance of the Shchepkin School in 1863 received a building on Neglinnaya Street, where it remains to this day.

In 1943, the school received the status of a higher educational institution.

The rector of the school is Professor Boris Nikolaevich Lyubimov, Honored Artist of the Russian Federation.

References

External links 
  
  

Drama schools in Russia
Performing arts education in Russia
Cultural heritage monuments of regional significance in Moscow